Myene is a cluster of closely related Bantu varieties spoken in Gabon by about 46,000 people. It is perhaps the most divergent of the Narrow Bantu languages, though Nurse & Philippson (2003) place it in with the Tsogo languages (B.30). The more distinctive varieties are Mpongwe (Pongoué), Galwa (Galloa), and Nkomi.

Notes

 le myènè en ligne sur :  'awanawintche.com', le myene en ligne : proverbes, contes, cours en audio mp3, histoires, rites et légendes o'myènè.

Bibliography
Jacquot, A. (1976) Etude de la phonologie et de la morphologie myene, in ''Etudes Bantoues II', Bulletin SELAF 53, Paris, 13–79.
Philippson, G. & G. Puech (1996) 'Tonal domains in Galwa (Bantu, B11c)'
 The Bantu languages

External links 
 ELAR archive of Comparative documentation of the Myene language cluster: Adyumba, Enenga, Galwa, Mpongwe, Nkomi and Orungu

Tsogo languages
Languages of Gabon